Rag pudding is a savoury dish consisting of minced meat and onions wrapped in a suet pastry, which is then cooked in a cheesecloth. Invented in Oldham, the dish is also popular in Bury and Rochdale, and is eaten across the Lancashire area. Rag pudding pre-dates ceramic basins and plastic boiling bags in cookery, and so the cotton or muslin rag cloths common in Oldham were used in the dish's preparation during the 19th century. Rag pudding is similar in composition and preparation to steak and kidney pudding, and may be purchased from traditional local butcher's shops in Lancashire.

References
Citations

Bibliography

Further reading

External links

Rag pudding with mash recipe, on channel4.com, as appeared on Come Dine with Me

English cuisine
Savory puddings
Culture in Lancashire
Oldham
Ground meat